Egidio Mauri (9 December 1828 – 13 March 1896) was an Italian cardinal, since 1893 Archbishop of Ferrara, member of the Dominican Order.

References

1828 births
1896 deaths
19th-century Italian cardinals
Cardinals created by Pope Leo XIII